Louis de Wecker (29 September 1832 – 24 January 1906) was a French ophthalmologist born in Frankfurt am Main, Germany.

He studied medicine in Würzburg, Berlin, Vienna and Paris, earning doctorates from Würzburg (1855) and Paris (1861). From 1862 he maintained a popular ophthalmology clinic in Paris.

In 1867 he performed an enucleation of the eye of Léon Gambetta. His name is associated with "de Wecker scissors", which are small sharp-pointed scissors used for intraocular surgery of the iris and lens capsule.

Dr. José Rizal (1861-1896), martyr and national hero of the Philippines, completed his ophthalmological training under Professor Louis de Wecker in Paris in 1885.

Selected writings 
 Traité des maladies du fond de l'oeil et Atlas d'ophthalmoscopie, 1870 with Eduard Jäger von Jaxtthal; (Treatise on maladies of the fundus of the eye and an atlas of ophthalmoscopy). 
 De l'iridotomie, 1873 (Iridotomy).
 Échelle métrique pour mesurer l'acuité visuelle, 1877 (Metric scale to measure visual acuity).
 Traité complet d'ophthalmologie, with Edmond Landolt (Comprehensive treatise of ophthalmology).
 "Ocular therapeutics"; translated into English in 1879.
 Traité theorique et pratique des maladies des yeux (Theoretical and practical treatise on maladies of the eye).
 Ophtalmoscopie clinique, 1881 (Clinical ophthalmoscopy).

References 
 Pagel: Biographisches Lexikon (biographical information)

Physicians from Frankfurt
University of Würzburg alumni
1906 deaths
1832 births
French ophthalmologists
Burials at Passy Cemetery